Amparo Baró San Martín MML (21 September 1937 – 29 January 2015) was a Spanish actress. She starting working in theatres with Adolfo Marsillach. She first garnered critical and popular acclaim for her role as "Sole" in 7 Vidas. Her career spanned more than 50 years. She worked on stage, as well as in films and television.

Life
She discovered her vocation when her brothers took her to the theater, and 20 years later, she debuted on stage. This started the career of this fine, young-faced actress with roles in stage and in film distribution. After completing high school at a young age, she began her artistic activities, integrating into several groups of amateur theater in her native Catalonia. Her professional debut was on stage along with Adolfo Marsillach, in Windsor Theater (Barcelona), in 1957.

She was honored numerous times for her work. On 7 December 2007, the Council of Ministers of Spain presented her with the Gold Medal for Merit in Work. She died from cancer, aged 77, in 2015.

Filmography

Siete mesas de billar francés (2007), de Gracia Querejeta
Noviembre (2003), de Achero Mañas
El Palomo cojo (1995), de Jaime de Armiñán
Boca a boca (1995), de Manuel Gómez Pereira
Al otro lado del túnel (1994), de Jaime de Armiñan
Las cosas del querer: Segunda parte (1993), de Jaime Chávarri
Al otro lado del túnel (1992), de Jaime de Armiñán
Soldadito español (1989), de Antonio Giménez Rico
Las cosas del querer (1988), de Jaime Chávarri
Mi general (1987), de Jaime de Armiñán
Cara de acelga (1987), de José Sacristán
El bosque animado (1987), de José Luis Cuerda
Stico (1985), de Jaime de Armiñán
El elegido (1985), de Fernando Huertas 
En septiembre (1982), de Jaime de Armiñán
Apaga... y vámonos (1981), de Antonio Hernández
27 millones libres de impuestos (1980), de Pedro Masó
El divorcio que viene (1981), de Pedro Masó
El nido (1979), de Jaime de Armiñán
Al servicio de la mujer española (1978), de Jaime de Armiñán
Carola de día, Carola de noche (1969), de Jaime de Armiñán
La banda del Pecas (1968), de Jesús Pascual
Tengo 17 años (1964), de José María Forqué
La chica del trébol (1963), de Sergio Grieco
A Land for All (1962), de Antonio Isasi-Isasmendi
Margarita se llama mi amor (1962), de Ramón Fernández
Tres de la Cruz Roja (1962), de Fernando Palacios 
Adiós, Mimí Pompón (1961), de Luis Marquina
Sendas cruzadas (1961), de Juan Xiol 
Llama un tal Esteban (1960), de Pedro Luis Ramírez 
Trío de damas (1960), de Pedro Lazaga
Rapsodia de sangre (1957), de Antonio Isasi-Isasmendi
Carta a Sara (1957), de Leonardo Bercovici y Claudio Gora

Honours 
 Gold Medal of Merit in Labour (Kingdom of Spain, 7 December 2007).

References

External links

1937 births
2015 deaths
Best Supporting Actress Goya Award winners
Actresses from Barcelona
Spanish stage actresses
Spanish film actresses
Spanish television actresses
Deaths from cancer in Spain
20th-century Spanish actresses
21st-century Spanish actresses